Parachela hypophthalmus is a species of cyprinid in the genus Parachela. It has been assessed as least concern by the IUCN, and is considered harmless to humans.

References

Cyprinid fish of Asia
Fish of Thailand
Fish of Malaysia
Fish of Indonesia
IUCN Red List least concern species
Cyprinidae